Laceyella is a Gram-positive, thermophilic, spore-forming and aerobic bacterial genus from the family of Thermoactinomycetaceae. The genus Laceyella is namened after the English microbiologist John Lacey.

References

Further reading 
 
 
 

Bacillales
Bacteria genera
Thermophiles